Viliami Mavaetangi Okalani Nasio (born 24 April 1986, in Rewa) is an Australian professional boxer. Nasio is of Tongan Descent.

Nasio is ranked in multiple major regional rankings, including 9th in WBO Asia Pacific and 2nd in WBC – OPBF.

Nasio's biggest bout in his career was against Japanese boxer Kyotaro Fujimoto for the vacant WBC – OPBF Heavyweight Title and the first time fighting out of Australia as a professional. Nasio lost the bout by unanimous decision.

Personal life
Nasio's parents are both from Tonga and migrated to New Zealand to find a better life for their children. Nasio was born and raised in New Zealand with five younger brothers. Nasio attended Wesley College and James Cook High and also enjoyed a year of high school in America.  At 19 he served a two-year volunteer mission for the LDS church and that included serving the community and teaching Christian principles. Nasio is married and lives on the Gold Coast. He has three boys. He currently works as a support worker in a mental health facility.

Professional boxing titles
Australian New South Wales State
Australia – New South Wales State heavyweight title (262½Ibs)
Australian National Boxing Federation
Australian National heavyweight title (257¾Ibs)
Australian Queensland State
Australia - Queensland State heavyweight title (241½Ibs)

Professional boxing record

References

External links

1986 births
Living people
New Zealand sportspeople of Tongan descent
Heavyweight boxers
Tongan male boxers
Australian sportspeople of Tongan descent
Australian male boxers
New Zealand male boxers
People educated at Wesley College, Auckland
People educated at James Cook High School
Sportspeople from the Gold Coast, Queensland